In June 2012, Ireland toured New Zealand playing three Tests against the All Blacks. The Irish tour was one in a series of tours by northern teams to be hosted by southern hemisphere nations. It was marketed as the 'Steinlager Series'.

In planning the series, it was anticipated that Ireland would also face provincial and Māori opposition, however, to allow Ireland to focus on the Tests, the IRFU decided that there would be no mid-week fixtures.

New Zealand won the series 3–0. In the third and final Test in Hamilton on 23 June, the All Blacks won 60–0, inflicting upon Ireland their largest-ever defeat.

Test matches

First Test

 Three players made their full international debut for New Zealand: Brodie Retallick, Julian Savea and Aaron Smith.
 Three players made their full international debut for Ireland: Simon Zebo, Declan Fitzpatrick and Ronan Loughney.

Second Test

 This was Ireland's first Test match in Christchurch.

Third Test

New Zealand's 60–0 victory was their largest-ever winning margin against Ireland.
This remains Ireland's largest ever defeat.
Beauden Barrett made his international debut for New Zealand.

Touring squad
Ireland's 30-man squad for the three-Test tour of New Zealand. Ireland's initial squad for the clash against the Barbarians was announced on 15 May, no Leinster players were selected due to the RaboDirect PRO12 final. Ireland's 29-man squad for the three-Test tour of New Zealand was named on 21 May. Four additional players were added to the squad. Tommy Bowe was ruled out of the tour in early April after undergoing surgery to remove a haematoma. Stephen Ferris was ruled out of the tour due to a calf injury, he was replaced by McLaughlin. Isaac Boss was ruled out of the tour owing to an ongoing thigh problem, he was replaced by Marshall. Paul O'Connell was ruled out of the tour after failing to recover sufficiently from a knee injury, he was replaced by McCarthy. The additional players were Wilkinson and Henry. Loughney was also included to provide cover for Ross.

Head coach: Declan Kidney
 Caps updated before tour. Ages are as of the first Test on 9 June.

Coaching and management team

Home squad
New Zealand 30-man squad named for the three-Test series against Ireland. Hika Elliot will train with the squad to provide cover for Keven Mealamu.

Head coach: Steve Hansen
 Caps updated before tour. Ages are as of the first Test on 9 June.

Coaching and management team

See also
 2012 mid-year rugby test series
 2012 Rugby Championship
 History of rugby union matches between Ireland and New Zealand
 Ireland national rugby union team
 New Zealand national rugby union team

References

External links
2012 Ireland rugby union tour of New Zealand at ESPN

2012
2012 rugby union tours
2012 in New Zealand rugby union
tour